Fraser Public Schools is a public school district located in Fraser, Michigan in the United States.

Fraser Public Schools educates about 5,200 students. The majority of students were categorized as white, followed by black, with only 1–2% of the students Asian, Pacific Islander or Hispanic. By gender, the school district has a fairly even number of male and female students.

In 2013, the United States Patent and Trademark Office registered the trademark "Where Learning Drives Innovation" to Fraser Public Schools.  Classrooms in Fraser Public Schools are equipped with Promethean Boards (interactive whiteboards) and ActivExpressions (student response clickers). During the 2012–2013 school year, Fraser Public Schools completed the largest iPad deployment in Michigan and deployed 5,000 iPads to students.  The high school currently offers virtual and hybrid classes. Fraser Public Schools also partners with Rochester College, offering college courses at no cost to Fraser High School students on the campus of FHS.

Beginning in the 2016–2017 school year, Fraser Public Schools began offering an early release option for juniors and seniors at Fraser High School. If students meet academic and disciplinary guidelines, they are permitted to leave the school campus early each day. This seat-time waiver was made possible through the Michigan Department of Education's Innovation Council and approval from State Superintendent Brian Whiston.

In 2013 Fraser Public Schools was recognized as one of the best Communities for Music Education in the country by the NAMM Foundation. The Fraser High School Music Department annually competes in Heritage Music Festivals around the country, receiving invitations to the Festivals of Gold.

Schools

The district consists of the following schools:

Early childhood centers:
Thomas Dooley School/Early Childhood Center (daycare, preschool, DK)

Elementary schools:

 Thomas Edison Elementary (K-6)
 Dwight Eisenhower Elementary (K-6)
 Ralph Waldo Emerson Elementary (K-6)
 Mark Twain Elementary (K-6)
 Dr. Jonas Salk Elementary (K-6)
 Walt Disney Elementary (K-6)

Middle schools:

 Howard C. Richards Middle School (7–8)

High schools:
 Fraser High School (9–12)

Board of Education 
 Scott Wallace, President
 Todd Koch, Vice President
 Robyn Norbeck, Treasurer
 Linda Corbat, Secretary
 Dan Stawinski, Trustee
 Autumn Ochoa, Trustee
 Abigail Wasil, Trustee

The superintendent is Carrie Wozniak

History
The District's 1:1 mobile device initiative, funded by the passing of the District's $19.9 million bond in 2011, was noted as the largest iPad deployment in Michigan and ranked as one of the largest K-12 iPad deployments in the world. Students in grades 3–12 were provided individual devices in 2013. After several years of testing and sharing a classroom set, students in K-2 were provided iPads on a 1:1 ratio in the fall of 2015.

The District produces a series of video segments on recent initiatives in the School District each year.

In 2013, the United States Patent and Trademark Office registered the trademark "Where Learning Drives Innovation" to Fraser Public Schools.

In August 2013, former Fraser Public Schools teacher Gregory Austin was sentenced to a 15-year sentence for possession of child pornography.

Fraser Public Schools partnered with Rochester College at the start of the 2012–2013 school year in a program that features college courses taught by Fraser teachers on the high school's campus.  The program is offered at no cost to the students.

Awards and recognition
Richards Jr High Social Studies Teacher Dr. Calvin Behling was given a Fulbright Scholarship to study in Pakaistan in 1985 and a University of Michigan fellowship for South Asia studies in 1986.
Richards Jr High Mathematics Teacher Edward St. Clair was a participant in the Institute of High School Mathematics administered by the Woodrow Wilson National Fellowship Foundation at Princeton University.
Fraser Public Schools completed the largest iPad Deployment in Michigan history in 2013.
Fraser Public Schools was named a Best Community for Music Education by the NAMM Foundation in 2012, 2013, 2014, 2015 and 2016.
Fraser Public School's won an Award of Merit from the National School Public Relations Association (NSPRA) in 2012, the Golden Achievement Award by NSPRA in 2013, and two Distinguished Awards from the Michigan School Public Relations Association (MSPRA) in 2013.
The Director of Educational Technology and Information Systems for Fraser Public Schools, Kris Young, was awarded the Technology Coordinator of the Year by the Michigan Association for Computer Users in Learning in 2013.
The District's K-8 Media Specialist, Lori Wetzel, was recognized as an Apple Distinguished Educator in 2013.
Mark Twain Elementary was awarded the Bronze HealthierUS Schools Challenge Award by the USDA for the 2012–2013 School Year.
Fraser High School Broadcast Students received award for the best anti-bullying video in the nation in 2013.
Fraser High School journalists won a Student Emmy for productions in 2012 and 2013.

References

External links 
 

School districts in Michigan
Education in Macomb County, Michigan